Chris Perez may refer to:

 Chris Pérez (born 1969), American guitarist
 Chris Perez (baseball) (born 1985), American baseball player
 Chris Perez (gridiron football) (born 1969), American player of gridiron football